The Dennis Coralluzzo Invitational was a professional wrestling memorial event produced by the NWA New Jersey (NWA-NJ) promotion, which took place on September 26, 2009 at the Wayne PAL (Police Athletic League) in Wayne, New Jersey; It was held in honor of Dennis Coralluzzo, a longtime New Jersey wrestling promoter and one-time president of the National Wrestling Alliance, who had died on July 30, 2001 after suffering a fatal stroke. As part of the event, his family were present to accept his posthumous introduction to the NWA Hall of Fame. The event was sponsored by Smash Fight Wear, a mixed martial arts equipment manufacturer, and open to the general public free of charge. Twelve professional wrestling matches were featured on the event's card, with two including championships.

The main event was a standard wrestling match of a tournament final for the NWA New Jersey Television Championship between Crowbar and Judas Young, in which Crowbar won the vacant championship. Other participants included Justin Corino, Monsta Mack, Danny Demanto, Dan Maff, B-Boy and Josh Daniels. Another featured match was The Powers of Pain (The Barbarian & The Warlord) versus The Varsity Club (Baby Hughie & Rob Eckos). The vacant NWA New Jersey Television Tag Team Championship was won by Fire Power (Danny Inferno and Jim Powers) after defeating The Spirit Squad (Kenny and Mikey), and Rik Ratchett beat Biggie Biggs. Other wrestlers such as Afa Anoa'i Jr., Lance Cade, and Mike Mondo were among those originally scheduled to appear for the memorial show but later had to cancel their appearance.



Results
September 26, 2009 in Wayne, New Jersey (Wayne PAL)

Tournament bracket
This was a one-night tournament held on September 26, 2009. The tournament brackets were:

References

External links
Official page at NWANJ.com

2009 in professional wrestling
Professional wrestling memorial shows
Professional wrestling tournaments
Professional wrestling in New Jersey